Pakenham may refer to:

People
Pakenham (surname)

Places
 Pakenham, Ontario, Canada
 Pakenham, Suffolk, United Kingdom
Pakenham Windmill
 Pakenham, Victoria, Australia
 Pakenham Secondary College
 Pakenham railway line
 Pakenham railway station

Other
HMS Pakenham, the name of three ships of the Royal Navy

See also